Instituto Español Vicente Cañada Blanch (Vicente Cañada Blanch Spanish School) is a Spanish international school in Kensington, London, England, using a Spanish curriculum for students ages 5 through 19. The Spanish government owns the school, which occupies a former Dominican convent, and the Ministry of Education, Culture and Sports of Spain manages the school. In 2018/19 school year it had 432 students and an additional 44 in sixth from year. The school was established in Greenwich in 1972 and moved to its current location in 1982.

See also
 Spaniards in the United Kingdom
 Spain–United Kingdom relations

References

External links
 Blog
 YouTube channel
 Instituto Español Vicente Cañada Blanch
 English site at Tripod.com
 Profile at Royal Borough of Kensington and Chelsea

Educational institutions established in 1972
Private co-educational schools in London
Private schools in the Royal Borough of Kensington and Chelsea
International schools in London
London
1972 establishments in England